Sagar Dhakal (born 14 December 2001) is a Nepalese cricketer playing for the Nepal national team. In February 2022, he was named in Nepal's Twenty20 International (T20I) squad for the 2021–22 Oman Quadrangular Series. Dhakal made his T20I debut on 11 February 2022, for Nepal against Oman. In March 2022, he was named in Nepal's One Day International (ODI) squad for the 2022 United Arab Emirates Tri-Nation Series. He made his ODI debut on 16 March 2022, for Nepal against Papua New Guinea.

References

External links

2001 births
Living people
Nepalese cricketers
Nepal One Day International cricketers
Nepal Twenty20 International cricketers
Place of birth missing (living people)